Diego Antonio Reyes Sandoval (born 11 January 1990) is a Honduran professional football player who plays as a forward for Olimpia in the Honduran Liga de Nacional. Reyes is well known in Honduras for his pace, technique, and dribbling abilities.

Club career
Diego Reyes began playing for C.D. Real Sociedad. His great performances at the club were congratulated. Then was transferred to C.D. Marathón.

International career
Reyes made his senior debut for Honduras on the 24th of July 2013 in the semifinals for the 2013 CONCACAF Gold Cup against United States. He then played a friendly game on 5 March 2014 against Venezuela coming in as a substitute in the 63rd minute for Jerry Palacios. He is family with Andri Peraza (14 years old)

Career statistics

Last update: 29 November 2020

References

External links
  
 
 
 www.sportlarissa.gr (Greek)

1990 births
Living people
Association football forwards
People from Colón Department (Honduras)
C.D. Real Sociedad players
C.D. Marathón players
Liga Nacional de Fútbol Profesional de Honduras players
Honduran footballers
Honduras international footballers
2013 CONCACAF Gold Cup players
2014 Copa Centroamericana players
2017 Copa Centroamericana players
Copa Centroamericana-winning players
C.D. Olimpia players